Rémi Cilia (born September 11, 1989 in Ollioules) is a French football player who last played for Toulon.

External links 
 
 
 

1989 births
Living people
French footballers
Ligue 2 players
AC Ajaccio players
People from Ollioules
Association football defenders
Sportspeople from Var (department)
Footballers from Provence-Alpes-Côte d'Azur